HPY may refer to:
 Baytown Airport, in Texas, United States
 Happy Air, a defunct Thai airline
 Heartland Payment Systems, a subsidiary of Global Payments
 Helsingfors telefonförening, now Elisa, a Finnish telecommunications company